Braun's Express, Inc. is a privately owned and operated American freight company serving the Northeast, Mid-Atlantic, and Midwest United States. Braun's operates eight terminals and specializes in supply-chain management for carpeting and flooring products, but also offers general less than truckload (LTL) shipping.

History
Braun's Express was founded in the 1930s by Joe Braun of Medway, Massachusetts as a single-truck delivery business. The business was purchased and incorporated in 1967 by Roy Nutting. The company's growth accelerated when it developed delivery of airfreight outside the Boston-Route 128 area. In 1978 Braun's became one of the first trucking companies in the area to use computers in the office. The company was bought by David and Cynthia Normandin in 1982. David had joined the company as a driver in 1978 and became Braun's president in 1981. Cynthia, owner of LTL and truckload carrier Normandin Transportation and a former math teacher, joined the company in 1985.

In 2009, Braun's operated five terminals along the east coast and by 2011 was operating 120 power units and 300 trailers from four terminals. The next year, Braun's acquired Surfaces Transport, Inc. and expanded its service area to include the Midwest, with new terminals in Illinois, Minnesota, and Wisconsin.

In 2015, a Braun's Express vehicle being operated in Brooklyn, New York, struck and killed a pedestrian.

Operations

Terminal locations
Braun's Express operates terminals in the following cities:

Sustainability
Braun's Express joined the Environmental Protection Agency (EPA) SmartWay Transport Partnership at the program's inception in 2004. The company was an early adopter of fuel-saving strategies, including single-wide tires, automatic tire-inflation systems,  and battery-powered auxiliary power units (APUs) versus the more common diesel-powered units. Braun's was named a "Massachusetts Energy Leader" in 2009 and was awarded an Environmental Merit Award by the EPA's New England region in 2010 and 2016.

References

External links
 Braun's Express website

Companies based in Worcester County, Massachusetts
Privately held companies based in Massachusetts
Economy of the Midwestern United States
Economy of the Northeastern United States
Trucking companies of the United States
Logistics companies of the United States
Transportation companies based in Massachusetts